Northcote railway station is located on the Mernda line in Victoria, Australia. It serves the north-eastern Melbourne suburb of Northcote, and opened on 8 October 1889 as Middle Northcote. It was renamed Northcote on 10 December 1906.

History
Northcote station opened on 8 October 1889, when the Inner Circle line was extended from North Fitzroy to Reservoir. Like the suburb itself, the station is believed to be named after Stafford Henry Northcote, who was British Chancellor of the Exchequer between 1874-1880, Foreign Secretary between 1885-1886, and a co-author of the Northcote–Trevelyan Report in 1853.

In 1973, both platforms were extended at the down end of the station.

In 1986, the former goods sidings, located at the down end of the station, were abolished. A crossover, also located at the down end, was spiked out of use around that time, and was removed at a later date.

During October 1987, the double line block systems between Northcote and Merri and Northcote and Thornbury were abolished, and replaced with three position signalling. Also in that year, boom barriers replaced interlocked gates at the Arthurton Road level crossing, located at the down end of the station. The signal box for the level crossing was also abolished during that time.

On 4 May 2010, as part of the 2010/2011 State Budget, $83.7 million was allocated to upgrade Northcote to a Premium Station, along with nineteen others. However, in March 2011, this was scrapped by the Baillieu Government.

Platforms and services
Northcote has two side platforms. It is served by Mernda line trains.

Platform 1:
  all stations and limited express services to Flinders Street

Platform 2:
  all stations services to Mernda

Transport links
Dysons operates one bus route via Northcote station, under contract to Public Transport Victoria:
 : Alphington station – Moonee Ponds Junction

Yarra Trams operates two routes via Northcote station:
 : West Preston – Victoria Harbour (Docklands)
 : Bundoora RMIT – Waterfront City (Docklands)

Gallery

References

External links
 Melway map at street-directory.com.au

Railway stations in Melbourne
Railway stations in Australia opened in 1889
Railway stations in the City of Darebin